Claudia Reinhardt (born 1964 in Viernheim) is a contemporary German photographer. She lives and works in Norway and Berlin.

Early life
Claudia Reinhardt was born in southern Germany in 1964. In the age of eighteen she left her home town to live for one year in London. Back in Germany she studied philosophy and literary history in Heidelberg. After two years she broke her studies and started to teach herself in photography. She moved to Berlin to work as a photo assistant. After few years she moved to Hamburg to work as a freelance fashion photographer. Her work was published in different magazines (Szene, Tempo, ID- London). In 1988–1994 she was a student at the art academy in Hamburg. Her main teacher was Bernhard Johannes Blume. In that time she founded the art magazine Neidtogether with Ina Wudtke and Heiko Wichmann. Through a grant from the DAAD (Deutsch Akademischer Austauschdienst) she was able to live and work in Los Angeles, where she visited the University of California and the Irwin University/California. After this year she moved back to Berlin. In 2000 she started her teaching job at the Art academy in Bergen/Norway. She held that position as associated professor until 2012. Nowadays she lives and works as an artist in Berlin and Oslo.

Photography

Killing Me Softly- Todesarten

Killing Me Softly- Todesarten is a series of ten photographs depicting the suicides of ten female artists, with Claudia Reinhardt as the model for all of them. The series includes Sarah Kane, Unica Zürn, Clara Immerwahr, Sylvia Plath, Adelheid Duvanel, Ingeborg Bachmann, Anne Sexton, Diane Arbus, Pierre Molinier, and Karin Boye

No Place Like Home
No Place Like Home is a series of 25 photographs based on the town, Viernheim, which Reinhardt grew up in.

Tomb Of Love - Grabkammer der Liebe
Dødspar, Liebespaare is a series of 23 photographs where Reinhardt stages the suicides of couples. Like in her series Killing Me Softly - Todesarten she uses authentic histories to visualize the last moment of these peoples lives. The series includes Stefan Zweig and Lotte Zweig, Heinrich von Kleist and Henriette Vogel, André Gorz and his wife Dorine, Jochen Klepper and his wife Johanna Stein and her daughter Renate, Arthur Koester and Cynthia Jefferies, Bernard und Georgette Cazes and others.

Video installation

Liebesmüh`- Lovers Labour
Liebesmüh`- Loves Labour is a series of five videos with a total running time of 30 minutes. It depicts fictional female characters who were created by male authors in the end of 19th century. The serie includes: Nora by Henrik Ibsen, Nana by Émile Zola, Effi Briest by Theodore Fontane, Anna Karenina by Leo Tolstoi and Madame Bovary by Gustave Flaubert.

No Place Like Home
No Place Like Home is a video based on her photo series with the same name and has a running time of 12 minutes.

Collections
Reinhardt's work can be found in the collections of Gaby u. Wilhelm Schurmann, Aachen, and F.C. Gundlach, Hamburg, among others.

Exhibitions

Solo exhibitions/selection 
 1998: Schau mich bitte nicht so an..., Galeria Prowincjonalna, Slubice, Poland
 1999: She must be seeing things, The Pound Gallery, Seattle, United States
 2000: Claudia Reinhardt presents..., Galerie Hallamar/Dietrich, Berlin
 2001: Killing Me Softly/Todesarten - Skizzen, Galerie White Cube, Bergen, Norway
 2001: Claudia Reinhardt and Birgit Böchers, Galerie Fahrradladen, Frankfurt/Offenbach, Germany
 2004: Killing Me Softly/Todesarten - Bookrelease, Galerie Engler& Piper, Berlin
 2005: Killing Me Softly/Todesarten, Kulturhuset Tromsø
 2005: Shot Stories, Galerie Richter & Brückner, Köln
 2007: Underdagen, Hordaland Kunstsenter, Bergen, Norway
 2007: Black Hole Memorise, Kunstverein Langenhagen, Germany
 2008: Per Teljer & Claudia Reinhardt, Skänes Kunstförening Malmö, Sweden
 2008: Heimat-Hotel, Breda Foto Bienale, IDFX Electron, Breda, Nederlands
 2011: Liebesmüh' - Lover's Labour, Galerie Richter & Brückner, Köln; Kunstforening Rauland, Norge
 2012: Trauerarbeit, Rom 8, Bergen, Norge
 2014: Dødspar, Liebespaare, Haus Dietrich, Berlin
 2015: Que nos espera nas ruas?, De Liceira 18, Porto, Portugal, Dødspar, Liebespaare, Galerie Format, Malmö, Sweden
 2016:	Galerie Malopolski Ogród Sztuki, Krakau, Poland

Group exhibitions
 1999: Rosa für Jungs- Hellblau für Mädchen, NGBK Kunstamt Kreuzberg, Berlin
 1999: Neid Show, Künstlerhaus Bethaninen, Berlin
 2000: Kein Betreff" Berlin Video, Rumseksogfyrre Arhus/Denmark
 2001: Communication Front 2001, Plovdiv/Bulgaria
 2001: Slubice-Berlin, Galeria Prowincjonalna, Slubice/Poland
 2002: the island and the aeroplane, Galerie Sparwasser, Berlin
 2003: Same- Different, Galerie Nova, Bukarest/Rumania
 2004: Killing Me Softly - Todesarten, Pro qm, Berlin
 2006: Me, Myself and I, Galerie gutleut 15, Frankfurt; Galerie Hobbyshop, München; KONSORTIUM Düsseldorf
 2007: Global Feminism, Brooklyn Museum, New York City; Davis Museum and Cultural Center, Wellesley, Massachusetts
 2007: Töten, Zeitraumexit, Mannheim. Germany
 2007: Lebe Wohl. Suizidalität, Kunst und Gesellschaft, Kunsthaus Hamburg, Germany
 2008: Western Norway Exhibition/Norway, Ålesund, Kunstmuseet Kube; Førde, Sunnfjord Kunstlag; Bergen, HKS - Hordaland Kunstsenter;Haugesund, Kunstforening;Stavanger, Kunstforening
 2008: Pineapple Videobar, Skånes Konst, Galleri Leonard, Malmö/Sweden
 2008: Photo Art Erosion, Klaipeda Hall, Lithuania
 2009: Videoworks from Norway/Screening, Gallery Fine Arts Academy. Bosnia Hercegovina, Trebinje
 2009: You Can Find Me In The Lexicon, In The Lexicon, Migros Museum, Zürich
 2009: Art Video Exchange- international Video Festival, Rauland Kunstverein, Norway
 2010: Everybody, Kunsthalle Memingen MEWO, Germany
 2010: Art Video Festival, Marco Testaccio, La Pelanda, Museum of Contemporary Art, Rome, Italy
 2011: Stories From Under The Pale Moon, Meta House, Phnom Penh, Cambodia
 2011: Dirty Fingers, Ruine, Die Wiesenburg, Berlin.
 2012: art:screen Fest Örebro, Sweden
 2015: Exitus, Galerie im Körnerpark, Berlin
 2012: Traumschiffkollektiv - Queere Filmtage, Beauty Salon, Zûrich
 2013: art:screen Fest, Reykjavík, Iceland
 2015: Danish Graphic Association, Kopenhagen, Dänemark, 
 2015: Uncany Feminism, Coreana Museum, Seoul, Korea
 2015: 25 Jahre Künstlerhaus Art Acker, Galerie Art Acker, Berlin 
 2015: Kvinner! Frem! Museum of Contemporary Art, Roskilde, Denmark
 2015: Wer war Albert Norden?, Station urbaner Kultur, NGBK, Berlin 
 2015: Wer ist wo wer? - Identite: Menneske og sted,Østlanduststillingen, Oslo and Kiel
 2015: Exitus, Tod, Trauer und Melancholie, Galerie im Körnerpark, Berlin (curated by Claudia Reinhardt)

Notes

Further reading

Selected published works

External links
 CV on Artist's Official Website

1964 births
Living people
Photographers from Hesse
German women photographers
People from Bergstraße (district)